Roy Greenwood is the name of:

 Roy Greenwood (footballer, born 1931), English professional footballer for Crystal Palace
 Roy Greenwood (footballer, born 1952), English professional footballer for Hull City, Sunderland, Derby County, Swindon Town, Huddersfield Town and Tranmere Rovers